Andrew Romero (born 19 September 1950 in Granada) is a former French cyclist.

Palmares
1975
9th overall Critérium du Dauphiné Libéré
1976
6th overall Tour de Suisse

Results on the grand tours

Tour de France
1974: 15th
1975: 12th
1976: 39th
1977: DNF (2nd stage)
1978: 15th

Vuelta a España
1977: 29th

References

1950 births
Living people
French male cyclists
Sportspeople from Granada